This is a list of cancer hospitals in Pakistan by respective province and territory.

Azad Jammu & Kashmir

Kashmir Institute of Nuclear Medicine & Radiotherapy.

Balochistan
 Centre For Nuclear Medicine & Radiotherapy (CENAR), Quetta

Gilgit-Baltistan
 Gilgit Institute of Nuclear Medicine Oncology, Gilgit

Islamabad Capital Territory
 Nuclear Medicine, Oncology & Radiotherapy Institute (NORI) (Pakistan Institute of Medical Sciences), 
Quaid-e-Azam International Hospital  
Shifa International Hospital Islamabad, Islamabad

Khyber Pakhtunkhwa
 Northwest General Hospital & Research Centre, Peshawar
 Shaukat Khanum Memorial Cancer Hospital & Research Centre, Peshawar
 Bannu Institute of Nuclear Medicine Oncology and Radiotherapy (BINOR), Bannu
 Institute of Nuclear Medicine, Oncology & Radiotherapy (INOR), Abbottabad
 Institute of Radiotherapy & Nuclear Medicine (IRNUM), Peshawar
 Swat Institute of Nuclear Medicine Oncology & Radiotherapy (SINOR), Saidu Sharif

Punjab
 Cancer Care Hospital & Research Centre, Cancer care hospital
 Shaukat Khanum Memorial Cancer Hospital & Research Centre, Lahore
 Bahawalpur Institute of Nuclear Medicine & Oncology (BINO), Bahawalpur
 Centre for Nuclear Medicine (CENUM), Lahore
 Gujranwala Institute of Nuclear Medicine (GINUM), Gujranwala
 Institute of Nuclear Medicine and Oncology (INMOL), Lahore
 Multan Institute of Nuclear Medicine and Radiotherapy (MINAR), Multan
 Punjab Institute of Nuclear Medicine and Radiotherapy (PINUM), Faisalabad
 Department of Surgery and Surgical Oncology, Shaikh Zayed Medical Complex, Lahore (Cancer Surgery Service only)

Sindh
 Neurospinal and Cancer Care Institute (NCCI), Karachi
 Ziauddin Cancer Hospital Ziauddin University Karachi
 Baitul Sukoon Cancer Hospital Karachi
 The Cancer Foundation Hospital Karachi
 The Aga Khan University Hospital, Karachi
 Shaukat Khanum Memorial Cancer Hospital & Research Centre, Karachi
 Atomic Energy Medical Centre (AEMC), Karachi 
 Karachi Institute of Radiotherapy and Nuclear Medicine (KIRAN), Karachi
 Larkana Institute of Radiotherapy and Nuclear Medicine (LINAR), Larkana
 Nuclear Institute of Medicine & Radiotherapy (NIMRA), Jamshoro
 Nuclear Medicine Oncology & Radiotherapy Institute (NORIN), Nawabshah
 Cyberknife, jinnah hospital karachi
 Sindh Institute of Urology and Transplantation, Karachi
 Pak Onco Care, Karachi
 Dow University of Health Sciences, Karachi
 Indus Children Cancer Hospital

See also 
 List of hospitals in Pakistan

References 

Hospitals in Pakistan
Cancer hospitals
Cancer hospitals in Pakistan